The Northern Ireland national under-23 football team is an association football team representing Northern Ireland featuring footballers playing in the Irish League.  The team first played at this level in 2007 when entering the International Challenge Trophy for national semi-professional Under-23 sides, though previously the Northern Ireland Under-23 team offered a recognised stepping stone for all young players hoping to progress to the full Northern Ireland side.

The Original Under-23s
The original Northern Ireland Under-23 side played a total of ten matches, all but three in the 1960s.  Players to have stepped up from the Under-23 side to full international level include Pat Jennings, Bryan Hamilton, Neil Lennon and Sammy Clingan.

Results

The New Under-23s
The Irish FA announced on 2 October 2007 that they would be entering a side in the International Challenge Trophy. The team was selected only from players playing in the IFA Premiership and as such it is also a successor to the Irish League representative team. For the 2007–09 International Challenge Trophy the team was managed by Linfield's David Jeffrey and for the 2009-11 International Challenge Trophy  by Portadown's Ronnie McFall. On both occasions Northern Ireland failed to make it beyond the group stage, and have not entered a team since.

2007–09 International Challenge Trophy

2009–11 International Challenge Trophy

Squad
Squad for the match against Portugal, 12 October 2010. Clubs correct at time of call-up.

Competitive record

International Challenge Trophy
2009 - Group Stage
2011 - Group Stage

References

External links
Irish FA Website

Un
European national under-23 association football teams
Youth association football in Northern Ireland